Beldari is a village and Village Development Committee  in Bara District in the Narayani Zone of south-eastern Nepal. At the time of the 1991 Nepal census it had a population of 2,836 persons living in 466 individual households.

Ward No. 5 
Ward Office: - Beldari

Includes Vdc: - Beldari (Ward 5 & 8) and Pakadiya Chikani (Ward 1 & 8)

Total Area: - 4.38 (Square K.M.)

Total Population: - 3344 (2011)

Ward Contact Person Name, Post, and Contact

References

External links
UN map of the municipalities of Bara District

Populated places in Bara District